Heiko Antoniewicz (born 10 November 1965 in Dortmund, Germany) is a German chef who uses techniques of molecular gastronomy, including sous-vide.

Antoniewicz has cooked for Crown Prince Harald of Norway,  Queen Elizabeth II, and Angela Merkel.

Published works
Molecular Basics: Fundamental Principles And Recipes Matthaes (2008)

References

External links
Homepage

1965 births
German chefs
Living people
Molecular gastronomy